Demydiv is a village in Vyshhorod Raion, Kyiv Oblast, Ukraine. It belongs to Dymer settlement hromada, one of the hromadas of Ukraine. Demydiv lies on the western bank of the Irpin River, north of Kyiv. It is one of the oldest villages in Ukraine, founded in 1026. 

Until the building of the Irpin Dam in 1960, the landscape of Demydiv was largely swamp and marshland.

During the 2022 Russian invasion of Ukraine, it was flooded by breaking the dam on 25 February to hinder Russian advances towards Kyiv.

References

Villages in Vyshhorod Raion